Wings of a Dove is a 2018 Nigerian film produced and directed by Omoni Oboli. The movie expresses dissatisfaction over girl-child marriage and encourages the need to educate our females. The film stars Zack Orji, Omoni Oboli, Sani Danja, Yakubu Mohammed, Amal Umar, and Martha Felix.

Synopsis 
The movie revolves around two young northern girls who were forcefully married in their teenage. In which all they needed was a free childhood experience.

Premiere 
The movie was globally premiered at the Cinemark Baldwin Hills and XD Theater, Los Angeles, U.S.A. on 8 February 2019.

Cast 
Zack Orji
Sani Danja
Yakubu Mohammed
Omoni Oboli
Amal Umar
Martha Felix

References 

2018 films
Nigerian drama films
English-language Nigerian films